Staphylococcus carnosus is a Gram-positive, coagulase-negative member of the bacterial genus Staphylococcus consisting of single and paired cocci.  Its genome has the highest GC content - 36.4% - of any sequenced staphylococcal species.

Staphylococcus carnosus was originally isolated from dry sausage and is involved in the production of meat products.

References

External links
Type strain of Staphylococcus carnosus at BacDive -  the Bacterial Diversity Metadatabase

carnosus
Bacteria described in 1982